The 2017 Miami Hurricanes football team  represented the University of Miami during the 2017 NCAA Division I FBS football season. It was the Hurricanes' 92nd season of football and 14th as a member of the Atlantic Coast Conference. The Hurricanes were led by second-year head coach Mark Richt and played their home games at Hard Rock Stadium. They finished the season 10–3 overall and 7–1 in the ACC to finish in first in the Coastal Division. They advanced to the ACC Championship Game where they lost to Clemson, 38–3. They were invited to the Orange Bowl where they lost to Wisconsin, 34–24.

Turnover Chain
Before the season Diaz suggested rewarding defensive players who recover fumbles or interceptions. Jeweler AJ "King of Bling" Machado created the Turnover Chain—a 36-inch, 5-5 pound, 10-karat gold Cuban link necklace with a large "U" charm covered with orange and green sapphires—in August 2017. Its gaudiness amazed the team and coaching staff, with one saying that "it's supposed to be larger than life".

ESPN described the chain as "quintessential Miami: flashy, swaggy, in your face, loud and flamboyant". Malek Young became the first to wear the chain, after intercepting a Bethune-Cookman pass in the end zone. Counterfeit shirts depicting the chain became available for sale within a week. Richt said, "It's good, clean fun. If we were 4-5 and had six turnovers, I think people would probably make fun of it. But when you win, things become cool sometimes".

Personnel

Coaching staff

Support staff

Roster

Recruiting

Position key

Recruits

The Hurricanes signed a total of 24 recruits.

Schedule

The scheduled game between Arkansas State and Miami originally set for September 9 was canceled in the wake of Hurricane Irma due to travel concerns and was not rescheduled.
The game between Florida State and Miami, originally scheduled to be played on September 16, was moved to October 7 due to the effects of Hurricane Irma.
The game between Georgia Tech and Miami, originally scheduled to be played on October 12, was moved to October 14.

Game summaries

Bethune–Cookman

Toledo

at Duke

at Florida State

Georgia Tech

Syracuse

at North Carolina

Virginia Tech

Notre Dame

Virginia

at Pittsburgh

Clemson - ACC Championship

Wisconsin - 2017 Orange Bowl

Rankings

2018 NFL Draft

References

Miami
Miami Hurricanes football seasons
Miami Hurricanes football